The National Olympic Committee of Ukraine is a non-profit all-Ukrainian public organization responsible for development, reinforcement, and protection of the Olympic movement. The committee has an exclusive right to represent Ukraine in the Olympic Games and other competitions of the International Olympic Committee.

History
The history of the Olympic movement in Ukraine started in 1952 when Ukrainian athletes participated at the Games of the XV Olympiad in Helsinki as a part of the U.S.S.R. Team for the first time.

During 1952 - 1990 the Olympic movement in Ukraine was developing and strengthening its position in the country's life. Ukrainian athletes constituted at least 25% of the composition of each USSR Olympic team. During the Games of the XXII Olympiad in 1980 some matches of football tournament took place in Kyiv and it was a great success.

On 22 December 1990 the First General Assembly of founders took the decision to create the National Olympic Committee of Ukraine and the date mentioned above is the official date of its foundation. On recommendations of the International Olympic Committee, on 20 September 1991 in Ukraine was established the Ukrainian Olympic Academy on decision of the first session of the Ukrainian Olympic Assembly. The academy is an independent public organization that functions under the auspices of the NOC of Ukraine and promotes development and strengthening of Olympic movement in Ukraine, spiritual interpersonal enrichment among people, proliferation the exchange of values of national culture marked by the ideas and principles of Olympism.

Couple of weeks after the referendum on independence, on 18 December 1991 the Verkhovna Rada petitioned to the International Olympic Committee to recognize the National Olympic Committee of Ukraine as a participant of Olympic movement since 1952.

The NOC of Ukraine was permanently recognized by the International Olympic Committee in September 1993.

In 1995 the NOC of Ukraine started to publish its official monthly magazine "Olimpiyska Arena" ("Olympic Arena") and since 1997 it issues twice a month bulletin "Olympic News from the NOC of Ukraine".

On 28 March 2017 the National Olympic Committee of Ukraine signed a memorandum on cooperation with the International Children Center "Artek" (Carpathian).

Description of the NOC
The NOC of Ukraine is working in accordance with the provisions of the Olympic Charter, the Ukrainian Constitution, the Ukrainian legislation and own Statutes.

Main tasks of the NOC of Ukraine are:
 to promote the preparation to and participation of athletes at the Olympic Games;
 to develop the international collaboration;
 to spread popular sports and healthy way of life;
 to enrich people physically and spiritually.
For this purpose the NOC of Ukraine cooperates with state, public and other organizations. The National Olympic Committee of Ukraine unites 40 Ukrainian Olympic sports federations.

The NOC of Ukraine participated in 6 winter editions and 5 summer editions of the Olympic Games.
 Lillehammer 1994 – 1 gold and 1 bronze medals;
 Atlanta 1996 – 9 gold, 5 silver, 9 bronze medals;
 Nagano 1998 – 1 silver medal;
 Sydney 2000 – 3 gold, 10 silver and 10 bronze medals;
 Salt Lake City 2002 – without medals;
 Athens 2004 – 8 gold, 5 silver and 9 bronze medals;
 Torino 2006 – 2 bronze medals;
 Beijing 2008 – 7 gold, 5 silver and 15 bronze medals;
 Vancouver 2010 - without medals;
 London 2012 – 6 gold, 5 silver and 9 bronze medals:
 Sochi 2014 - 1 gold and 1 bronze medals.
Mr. Sergey Bubka and Mr. Valeriy Borzov are officially elected as honorary members of International Olympic Committee in Ukraine.

The National Olympic Committee of Ukraine has its regional branches in each region of Ukraine. In similar way the Ukrainian Olympic Academy also has its regional branches in various educational institutions throughout Ukraine. To resolve any disagreements, there also exists Sport Arbitration Tribunal.

Committee Composition
 Two representatives from each (40) National Sport Federation (Olympic sports)
 15 athletes, participants of the Olympic Games
 a representative of the Olympic Academy of Ukraine
 a representative from each (4) fitness-sports club (Spartak, Dynamo, Ukraina, Kolos) and administrations of fitness and sports for both Ministry of Education and Ministry of Defense
 other representatives of the Olympic movement

Consists of 154 members

Presidents

NOC Projects

Heroes of Sports Year 
All-Ukrainian Ceremony «Heroes of Sports Year» is the grand sport event which has been held on the main stages of the country since 2007. This ceremony is a great occasion to meet Olympic champions and medalists of all times, coaches and sports specialists.

The sports «Oscar» is presented to athletes and coaches who won medals at the Olympic and world sports arenas. Sports organizers whose contribution was recognized the most substantial also get this award.

«The Olympic Book», «The Olympic Corner» 
Since 2011 National Olympic Committee of Ukraine together with the Olympic Academy of Ukraine organizes the nationwide actions «The Olympic Book» and «The Olympic Corner». During these projects each of over 20 000 schools and each of 230 classes is provided with Olympic literature and sports equipment.

The main goal is the development of the Olympic movement in Ukraine, promotion of healthy lifestyles, spreading the ideas of Olympism.

«The Olympic Lesson» 
The Olympic lesson is the annual sports event which was initiated by National Olympic Committee of Ukraine since 2004. The Olympic Lesson is held in all regions of the country.

Anyone who participates in the Lesson of Physical Education and Sports has a good chance to talk to champions and winners of the Olympic Games, World and European Championships and visit numerous sports venues, get important and useful information. Over 40 sports grounds present different sports holding open training sessions and demonstrations.

«Olympic Day» 
In the world there is a good tradition to celebrate Olympic Day dedicated to the International Olympic Committee's foundation (23 June 1894). Olympic Day is a family sports holiday where everyone finds something what he likes. At this event people can feel like real Olympians.

The Olympic Day takes place in the central town streets, in parks, children's camps, stadiums of different regions.

Together with the ordinary citizens the famous Ukrainian athletes, Olympic champions and medalists, winners of the World and European Championships participate at the all-Ukrainian event.

If your state of health does not allow participating in athletics races, you can join to the many contests, quiz and draws.

All members can find something useful and join to the Olympic ideas and values.

«Olympic stork» 
«Olympic stork» is the project of National Olympic Committee of Ukraine which promotes the Olympic ideas, attracts children to physical education and sport, and brings up young generation based on the principles of patriotism and friendship.

All the year the 5th -6th formers take a quiz on the Olympic movement topic, participate in the relay races, teams’ presentations and many different contests. The team-winner of all 25 Ukrainian regions compete at all-Ukrainian final.

«Pole Vaulting at Maidan» 
In 2007 competition of pole stars the «Pole Vaulting at Maidan» was initiated by National Olympic Committee of Ukraine. This event is organized by NOC of Ukraine and the Athletics Federation of Ukraine and is included to the official IAAF calendar.

The top athletes compete in the outdoor event at the main square of the country.

In 2011 Russian Aleksey Kovalchuk set a record of the tournament- 5.72 m.

The world record in the male pole vault outdoor – 6.14 m - belongs to the legendary Ukrainian Sergey Bubka. He also set the still unbroken indoor record - 6.15 m.

Collective members

National Sports Federations
There are 46 national federations for Olympic sports which are members of the NOC:

Performance

 Ukraine at the 1994 Winter Olympics
 Ukraine at the 1996 Summer Olympics
 Ukraine at the 1998 Winter Olympics
 Ukraine at the 2000 Summer Olympics
 Ukraine at the 2002 Winter Olympics
 Ukraine at the 2004 Summer Olympics
 Ukraine at the 2006 Winter Olympics
 Ukraine at the 2008 Summer Olympics
 Ukraine at the 2010 Winter Olympics
 Ukraine at the 2012 Summer Olympics
 Ukraine at the 2014 Winter Olympics
 Ukraine at the 2016 Summer Olympics
 Ukraine at the 2018 Winter Olympics

See also
 Unified Sports Classification of Ukraine – a standardized sports ranking system and accepted sports terminology
 National Sports Committee for the Disabled of Ukraine - governing sports organization for the disabled (National Paralympic Committee)
 Sports Committee of Ukraine – the Association of Public Organizations is a non-government organization (NGO) that promotes non-Olympic sports
 Ukraine at the Olympics

Further reading
 Hryvtseva, T. Development history of International and Ukrainian Olympic Movement. History of Olympic Sports of Ukraine, collection of scientific student works. Donetsk 2011.
 Bytyak, Yu. Administrative Law of Ukraine. "Urinkom Inter". Kiev 2007

References

External links
 Official website
 Website of the Sports Committee of Ukraine
 General overview of development of the Olympic movement in Ukraine
 Official website of "Olympic Arene" magazine, "Olympic Arena" is an official magazine of the National Olympic Committee of Ukraine and the former Ministry of Family, Youth, and Sports (merged with the Ministry of Education)
 Sports map of Ukraine
 List of Olympic centers
 History of sports development in the Ukrainian SSR. Sport History.ru
 List of regional departments. NOC of Ukraine.

 
Ukraine
Ukraine at the Olympics
Olympic
Organizations based in Kyiv
Sport in Kyiv
Sports organizations established in 1990
1990 establishments in Ukraine